Crompton Greaves Consumer Electricals Limited (also known as Crompton)  is an Indian electrical equipment company based in Mumbai, India. The company has lighting and electrical consumer durables including LED lighting, fans, pumps, and household appliances like water heaters, air coolers, and kitchen appliances.

As of February 2022, the company is indexed with S&P Global BSE Consumer Durables Index, a list of 10 top listed Indian consumer durables companies.

History 
The company was established in 1937 as Crompton Parkinson Works Limited, a wholly-owned subsidiary of Crompton Parkinson. In 1947, it was acquired by Karam Chand Thapar. The company was established in 2016 as an outcome of the demerger of Crompton Greaves Limited which separated the latter's consumer goods business from the power and industrial systems segment. The demerger plan was announced in July 2014 and it was completed in 2016 with the creation of CG Power and Industrial Solutions and Crompton Greaves Consumer Electricals Limited. At the time of demerger, Gautam Thapar, the former chairman of combined Crompton Greaves Limited, sold his 34% stake in CGCEL to Advent International and Temasek Holdings for ₹2000 crore.

Crompton's operation is divided into two segments: one is Electrical consumer durables (ECD) which include fans, appliances, and pumps. The other one is Lightings which includes LED and Non-LEDs products. Under the ECD, the company is considered a market leader in fans business with a 26% market share.

As of September 2020, the company has manufacturing facilities at Goa, Vadodara, Ahmednagar and Baddi. And one R&D centre at Vikhroli, in the suburb of Mumbai.

Controversies 
In November 2017, Reuters reported instances of "prescient messages" regarding the performance of 12 Indian companies in WhatsApp groups and it included Crompton. The information contained upcoming quarterly results, including specific metrics such as net profits, revenues, and operating margins. At that time, the matter was investigated by India's Securities and Exchange Board of India for insider trading by brokers. Later, in 2021, the Securities Appellate Tribunal (SAT) set aside the SEBI's order because the latter was failed to prove insider trading connection among and between the brokers.

References 

Companies listed on the National Stock Exchange of India
Companies listed on the Bombay Stock Exchange
Indian companies established in 1937
Indian companies established in 2016
Electronics companies of India
Consumer electronics brands
Home appliance manufacturers of India
Electronics companies established in 2016
2016 establishments in Maharashtra